Boardman may refer to:

People
Boardman (surname)

Places

United States
Boardman, Florida, unincorporated community in Marion County, Florida
Boardman, North Carolina, town in Columbus County, North Carolina
Boardman, Ohio, census-designated place in Mahoning County, Ohio
Boardman, Oregon, city in Morrow County, Oregon
Boardman Coal Plant, a power station in Boardman, OR
Boardman, Wisconsin, unincorporated community in St. Croix County, Wisconsin
Boardman River in Michigan
Boardman Township, Clayton County, Iowa
Boardman Township, Michigan
Boardman Township, Mahoning County, Ohio
Mount Boardman in the Diablo Range, California

Other
Boardman Airport, airport in Boardman, Morrow County, Oregon, United States
Boardman Books, British publishing company
Boardman Bikes, British bicycle manufacturer founded by cyclist Chris Boardman
Boardman Center Middle School, public middle school in Boardman, Ohio, United States
Boardman Creek, a stream in Camas County, Idaho
Boardman High School (Mahoning County, Ohio), public high school in Boardman, Ohio, United States
Boardman House (disambiguation), various
Boardman Lake (Idaho), a lake in the Soldier Mountains
Boardman Peak, a peak in the Soldier Mountains
Boardman Tasker Prize for Mountain Literature, British literary award
Boardman's Windmill, Norfolk, England
Naval Weapons Systems Training Facility Boardman, a U.S. Navy training range near Boardman, Oregon.
Operation Boardman, World War II Allied deception operation
The Boardman, a historic series of rowhouses in North Adams, Massachusetts, US